Hygrocybe procera is a colourful Hygrocybe (waxcap) fungus. First described as Hygrophorus procerus by Greta Stevenson in 1963, the species was transferred to Hygrocybe in 1971 by Egon Horak. It is only known with certainty from New Zealand.

Description

The fruit bodies of this fungus are red, orange or yellow with a cap up to 5 cm in diameter, and a 15–70 x 3–6 mm cylindrical stipe (stem) of uniform diameter, or tapering towards its base. It is seen between February and June in forests.

See also
List of Hygrocybe species

References

External links

procera
Fungi described in 1963
Fungi of New Zealand
Taxa named by Greta Stevenson